James Moginie (born 18 May 1956) is an Australian musician. He is best known for his work with Midnight Oil, of which he is a founding member, guitarist, keyboardist and leading songwriter.

Career
In addition to Midnight Oil, Moginie has worked and performed with many notable musicians from Australia and New Zealand, including Silverchair, Sarah Blasko, End of Fashion, Backsliders, Neil Murray, Kasey Chambers and Neil Finn. Moginie has also played live with The Family Dog comprising different members at times, including Trent Williamson, Kent Steedman, Paul Larsen Loughhead and Tim Kevin.

He has also released four solo works.

The four-track EP Fuzz Face was recorded in Moginie's small home studio with Midnight Oils' producer Nick Launay and released in 1996, with Midnight Oil bassist Bones Hillman contributing under the pseudonym "The Family Dog" – a term that Moginie would later use for his live band.

Alas Folkloric (2006) is Moginie's first full-length solo album and first release after Midnight Oil disbanded. The album features contributions from Martin Rotsey and Rob Hirst, as well as Paul Dempsey from the band Something for Kate on the track "Halfway Home", and was released through the Virgin Music label.

No Vans Mary (2010) by Shameless Seamus (Moginie's folk pseudonym) featured guest musicians including flugelhorn player Elizabeth Geyer, drummer Gus Bonic and bodhran player Kevin Kelly.
His interest in the traditional music of Ireland has deepened and his 7 piece band Shameless Seamus and The Tullamore Dews released the live in the studio Ballroom of Romance (2012.) Both were released through Moginie's Reverberama label. Moginie occasionally sings and plays bouzouki and guitar with a smaller group, The Tinkers, with core members Alan Healy (tenor banjo, bouzouki, vocals) and Evelyn Finnerty (fiddle, vocals).

In 2017 he released the EP ‘Under The Motherland’s Flag’, in 2018 ‘Perpetua’ and in 2019 ‘Armies Of The Heart’ through Orchard, appearing as ‘Triptych’ (2020) a three EP set on one CD available only through Reverberama. Most instruments were played by Moginie along with contributions by Lozz Benson (vocals and drums,) Sam Moginie (drums) and El Ninety (synthesiser and engineering.)

Moginie is still somewhat active in record production, co-producing Melbourne band The Fauves LP When Good Times Go Good released September 2008 and as a session player with Bill Chambers, Lyn Bowtell, Blind Valley, Leah Flanagan, Backsliders, The New Christs, Jordan Leser, Catherine Britt, Angie Hart, Kate Plummer, Love Parade and numerous others.

He has toured and recorded with Rob Hirst, Martin Rotsey and Brian Ritchie in The Break, whose surf rock album Church of the Open Sky was produced by Moginie and released on 16 April 2010 on the Bombora label, distributed by MGM. The band's second release Space Farm, a more adventurous work including Jack Howard on trumpet, was also produced by Moginie and was released worldwide on 15 March 2013 through the Sony Music label.

With Brian Ritchie, Moginie in 2013 and 2014 performed live with the ACO Underground (Australian Chamber Orchestra) in Sydney, Banff and New York City.

On 8 November 2017, during a performance as part of Midnight Oil's Great Circle Tour at The Sidney Myer Music Bowl in Melbourne, Moginie tore a hamstring during the last song of the main set. He finished the song but did not return for the encore.

In 2018, APRA AMCOS announced that Midnight Oil were to be the recipients of the 2018 Ted Albert Award for Outstanding Services to Australian Music at the 2018 APRA Music Awards.

Moginie co-produced (with the Celibate Rofles’ Kent Steedman) 'Bark Overtures' (2018) released by Sony Music and Orchard with his band The Family Dog, comprising Steedman, Paul Larsen Loughhead (Celibate Rifles, New Christs) Tim Kevin (Houlihan, Knievel, La Huva, Youth Group). The album is an edited live off the floor recording produced at Jim's Oceanic Studio and recorded to analog recording tape. They toured nationally throughout the summer months 2018–19 in Australia with 'The Summer of the DOG tour'.

After Midnight Oil reformed in 2017 for The Great Circle Tour in September- October 2019 they made ‘The Makaratta Project’ EP and a full album ‘Resist’ at Rancom Street Studios and Jim's Oceanic Studio. The former included collaborations with many Australian First Nations artists including Jessica Mauboy, Troy Cassar-Daly, Leah Flanagan, Ursula Yovich, Kaleena Briggs, Frank Yamma, Kev Carmody, Sammy Butcher (Warumpi Band,) Alice Skye, Tasman Keith and Dan Sultan. The latter was a 12 track album of songs. The band is currently undertaking its final ‘Resist’ tour covering Australia, United States, Canada, Belgium, Netherlands, Germany, United Kingdom, France and New Zealand with its final show at Sydney's Hordern Pavilion on 3 October 2022.

He has been active working on and mixing music created in prisons, ‘Songbirds 2’ (male NSW prisoners) with early Midnight Oil alumni Murray Cook and ‘Heart of A Woman’ (West Australian female indigenous prisoners) with prison music program administrator Angela Leech.

He co-produced ‘Tjungu’ (2019) by Neil Murray and Sammy Butcher, suite of songs they co-wrote in the community of Papunya. Moginie also engineered, played and mixed the project at Mixmasters (Adelaide) with Mick Wordley, Red House (Alice Springs) with Jeff McLaughlin and Oceanic Studio with Brent Clark, longtime Moginie collaborator.

Moginie engineered and played on ‘One Voice’ written by Rob Hirst, a tribute to Midnight Oil's Bones Hillman who died in 2020. The project was named The Hillmans and comprised Hirst, Moginie, drummer Hamish Stuart with Martin Rotsey, Peter Garrett, Jay O’Shea and Warne Livesey.

Other works include ‘The Night Garden’ (2017) with flautist Howlin’ Wind and mixing and extra instrument duties on Wind's ‘Symphony in F Minor’ (2022.)

References

External links

 Midnight Oil – official website
 Reverberama – Jim Moginie's website
 - official Facebook page
 - Jim Moginie Twitter feed

1956 births
Living people
APRA Award winners
Australian rock guitarists
Australian songwriters
Midnight Oil members
People educated at Sydney Church of England Grammar School